Reuben Heyday Margolin is an American-born artist and sculptor known for his mechanically driven kinetic sculptures of wave-forms. Some of the sculptures are hand-cranked and small scale, while others are large, installed in large high-ceiling spaces, suspended from the ceiling. His art also includes drawings, portraiture, traditional sculpture, and rickshaws.

Education
He was educated at Berkeley High School, then at Harvard University, where he earned a BA in English. He later studied drawing in Florence, Italy and Monumental painting at the St. Petersburg Academy of Arts, Russia.

Career
In Autumn of 2010, Margolin installed "Nebula", a kinetic art work with 4,500 amber crystals, in the Hilton Anatole Hotel in Dallas, Texas.  The piece has been described as "perhaps the most ambitious kinetic sculpture ever commissioned."

References

External links
Official site

21st-century American sculptors
Living people
Harvard University alumni
Year of birth missing (living people)